Thalassiothrix is a genus of Chromista belonging to the family Thalassionemataceae.

The genus was described in 1880 by Cleve and Grunow.

Species:
 Thalassiothrix acuta G. Karsten, 1905
 Thalassiothrix antarctica A. Schimper ex G. Karsten, 1905
 Thalassiothrix fruaenfeldii (Grunow) Grunow, 1880
 Thalassiothrix gibberula G.R. Hasle
 Thalassiothrix heteromorpha Karsten, 1907
 Thalassiothrix longissima Cleve & Grunow, 1880
 Thalassiothrix mediterranea Pavillard
 Thalassiothrix miocenica H.J. Schrader
 Thalassiothrix monospina H.J. Schrader
 Thalassiothrix robusta (H.J. Schrader) F. Akiba
 Thalassiothrix spathulata G.R. Hasle

References

Fragilariophyceae
Diatom genera